The 1985 NBA World Championship Series was the championship round of the National Basketball Association (NBA)'s 1984–85 season, and the culmination of the season's playoffs. It featured the defending NBA champion and Eastern Conference playoff champion Boston Celtics against the Western Conference playoff champion Los Angeles Lakers.

The Celtics were looking to repeat as NBA champions for the first time since the  season. The Celtics had home court advantage for the second year in a row as they finished the regular season with a 63–19 record while the Lakers compiled a 62–20 record. The Lakers looked to bounce back from the previous year's painful loss to the Celtics in the championship series, and were still seeking to beat Boston for the first time ever in NBA Finals history. Also for the first time since 1955, the Finals implemented a 2–3–2 format with Games 1 and 2 in Boston while the next three games were in Los Angeles. The final two games of the series would be played in Boston, if required. This change of format came after David Stern had a conversation with Celtics legend Red Auerbach in 1984, who disliked the frequent traveling between games. The 2–3–2 format would be used until the 2013 NBA Finals, after which the 2–2–1–1–1 format returned in 2014.

With the help of Kareem Abdul-Jabbar and Magic Johnson, the Los Angeles Lakers achieved their first NBA Finals victory over the Boston Celtics in nine meetings, four to two games. 

It was the last time the NBA World Championship Series branding would be in use as the NBA Finals branding would replace it for 1986.

The video documentary Return to Glory recaps the 1985 NBA Playoff action.

Background

Los Angeles Lakers

After losing to the Celtics in the previous year's finals, the Lakers entered the 1984–85 NBA season with a mission. Once again using the effective Showtime offense, they ran away with the Western Conference-leading 62 wins. The team as a whole underwent a slight evolution, as James Worthy supplanted Jamaal Wilkes as the starting small forward, while Byron Scott began to earn more minutes as the backup to both Magic Johnson and Michael Cooper.

In the playoffs, the Lakers eliminated the Phoenix Suns, Portland Trail Blazers and Denver Nuggets, going 11–2 in the three playoff rounds.

Boston Celtics

The Celtics repeated with the NBA's best record by winning 63 games. For the second straight season, Larry Bird won the MVP award, while Kevin McHale won Sixth Man Award for the second year running, despite making the transition from bench cog to starter late in the season with Cedric Maxwell nursing a knee injury. Danny Ainge also emerged as the team's starting shooting guard, after the Celtics traded Gerald Henderson to the Seattle SuperSonics in the offseason. 

The Celtics defeated the Cleveland Cavaliers, Detroit Pistons and Philadelphia 76ers, finishing with an 11–4 record heading into the finals. By that point, Boston's classic starting five under head coach K. C. Jones was solidified, featuring Bird, McHale and Robert Parish in the frontcourt, and Ainge and Dennis Johnson in the backcourt.

Road to the Finals

Regular season series
Both teams split the two meetings, each won by the home team:

Series summary

Game 1

The Celtics defeated the Lakers 148–114. It was dubbed the "Memorial Day Massacre" and a profound embarrassment for the Lakers team. Kareem Abdul-Jabbar had only 12 points and 3 rebounds, while Magic Johnson pulled down only one rebound. Danny Ainge of the Celtics started hot, scoring 15 points in the first quarter. Scott Wedman made all 11 shots he took from the field. Afterwards, Abdul-Jabbar apologized to his teammates for his terrible performance.

The 34-point differential set a new record for a Finals game between the Celtics and Lakers in their rivalry. This record would stand until the 2008 NBA Finals, when the Celtics defeated the Lakers, 131-92.

Game 2

The Lakers recovered from the Game 1 loss behind Abdul-Jabbar's 30 points, 17 rebounds, 3 blocks, and 8 assists. Lakers swingman Michael Cooper finished with 22 points on an 8 for 9 shooting performance, including several clutch outside jumpers down the stretch. The series was evened at 1–1.

Game 3

The Celtics held a 48–38 lead in the second quarter before the Lakers rallied and led, 65–59, at halftime. The Lakers pulled away in the second half and won the game 136–111. Abdul-Jabbar scored his 4,456th career point and became the league's all-time leading playoff scorer, which had previously been held by Lakers guard Jerry West. Larry Bird's shooting slump from game 2 continued. He shot a combined 17 of 42 from the field in games two and three. James Worthy led the Lakers with 29 points.

Game 4

The Celtics tied the series in the fourth game with a 107–105 win with a buzzer-beating jumper by Dennis Johnson, who scored 27 points. Kevin McHale led all players with 28 points to go along with 12 rebounds for the Celtics.

Game 5

In this game, the Lakers stomped out the Celtics by jumping out to a 64–51 lead and stretched it to 89–72 before the Celtics cut the deficit to 4 points, late in the 4th quarter. The Celtics would cut the lead to 4 points several times, but the Lakers answered each time. Magic Johnson made three shots, Kareem added four more shots, and Cooper hit 2 outside jumpers, and the Lakers came away with a 120–111 victory to take a 3–2 series lead.

Game 6

In the series clincher, the game was tied at halftime. The Lakers would hold the Celtics to just 18 third quarter points to pull away. Abdul-Jabbar scored 29 points and James Worthy scored 28 of his own, as Los Angeles became the first team to clinch a title at the Boston Garden. Magic Johnson dished out a game-high 14 assists. Celtics' forward Kevin McHale scored 32 points and grabbed 16 rebounds--both game-highs--before fouling out in the fourth quarter. Larry Bird's dismal shooting continued as he hit just 12 of 29 shots.

The 38-year-old Abdul-Jabbar was named MVP of the series, his second Finals MVP award and first since 1971 (back when he was known as Lew Alcindor), averaging 25.7 points, 9.0 rebounds, 5.2 assists and 1.5 blocks in six games. Worthy averaged 23.7 points for the Lakers, while Magic Johnson scored 18.3 points per game to go along with 14.0 assists and 6.8 rebounds. Los Angeles shot 51.2% as a team for the series.

McHale led Boston in scoring (26.0) and rebounding (10.7) while shooting 59.8% from the floor. Bird averaged 23.8 points and 8.8 rebounds on just 44.9% shooting. Celtics' guard Dennis Johnson led both teams in minutes played (247). Boston shot 47.6% from the floor while out-rebounding Los Angeles 259-256.

It was the first time (and only time until 2022) in NBA Finals history where the other team clinched the championship against the Celtics in Boston. It was also only the Celtics' second Finals series defeat, having previously lost to the St. Louis Hawks in 1958.

Player statistics

Los Angeles Lakers

|-! style="background:#FDE910;"
| align="left" |  || 6 || 6 || 35.5 || .604 || .000 || .769 || 9.0 || 5.2 || 1.0 || 1.5 || 25.7 
|-
| align="left" |  || 6 || 0 || 25.5 || .588 || .286 || .905 || 2.0 || 3.7 || 1.2 || 0.3 || 10.2 
|-
| align="left" |  || 6 || 6 || 39.2 || .494 || .500 || .871 || 6.8 || 14.0 || 2.2 || 0.0 || 18.3 
|-
| align="left" |  || 6 || 0 || 14.5 || .550 || .000 || .643 || 3.3 || 0.7 || 0.2 || 0.2 || 5.2 
|-
| align="left" |  || 2 || 0 || 3.0 || .000 || .000 || 1.000 || 0.0 || 0.5 || 0.0 || 0.0 || 1.0 
|-
| align="left" |  || 6 || 0 || 19.5 || .379 || .000 || .714 || 3.0 || 0.8 || 0.0 || 0.5 || 8.2 
|-
| align="left" |  || 4 || 0 || 6.5 || .500 || .600 || .667 || 1.0 || 0.5 || 0.0 || 0.0 || 4.8 
|-
| align="left" |  || 1 || 0 || 2.0 || .000 || .000 || .500 || 0.0 || 0.0 || 1.0 || 1.0 || 1.0 
|-
| align="left" |  || 6 || 6 || 22.0 || .500 || .000 || .538 || 8.5 || 0.8 || 1.3 || 0.5 || 7.5 
|-
| align="left" |  || 6 || 6 || 34.7 || .395 || .286 || .556 || 3.7 || 2.2 || 2.5 || 0.2 || 11.2 
|-
| align="left" |  || 4 || 0 || 6.8 || .600 || .000 || .500 || 1.8 || 1.5 || 0.3 || 0.3 || 3.5 
|-
| align="left" |  || 6 || 6 || 39.0 || .564 || .000 || .700 || 4.5 || 3.2 || 0.5 || 0.5 || 23.7 

Boston Celtics

|-
| align="left" |  || 6 || 6 || 33.8 || .414 || .400 || .750 || 3.0 || 7.0 || 2.0 || 0.0 || 11.0 
|-
| align="left" |  || 6 || 6 || 40.2 || .449 || .333 || .850 || 8.8 || 5.0 || 1.8 || 0.7 || 23.8 
|-
| align="left" |  || 4 || 0 || 7.8 || .545 || .000 || .000 || 1.5 || 2.0 || 0.3 || 0.0 || 3.0 
|-
| align="left" |  || 3 || 0 || 2.7 || .375 || 1.000 || .000 || 0.3 || 0.0 || 0.0 || 0.0 || 2.3 
|-
| align="left" |  || 2 || 0 || 3.5 || .500 || .000 || 1.000 || 0.5 || 1.5 || 0.5 || 0.0 || 2.0 
|-
| align="left" |  || 6 || 6 || 41.2 || .382 || .000 || .857 || 4.3 || 9.5 || 1.7 || 0.7 || 16.0 
|-
| align="left" |  || 5 || 0 || 8.8 || .444 || .000 || .500 || 2.0 || 0.6 || 0.2 || 0.0 || 1.8 
|-
| align="left" |  || 5 || 0 || 10.8 || .500 || .000 || .700 || 1.0 || 0.2 || 0.4 || 0.0 || 2.6 
|-
| align="left" |  || 6 || 6 || 40.0 || .598 || .000 || .727 || 10.7 || 1.3 || 0.3 || 1.8 || 26.0 
|-
| align="left" |  || 6 || 6 || 37.2 || .481 || .000 || .771 || 9.0 || 2.0 || 1.0 || 1.8 || 17.2 
|-
| align="left" |  || 6 || 0 || 17.5 || .611 || .636 || .556 || 3.3 || 1.7 || 0.8 || 0.0 || 9.3 
|-
| align="left" |  || 4 || 0 || 9.3 || .500 || .000 || .000 || 0.3 || 2.8 || 0.3 || 0.0 || 3.5

Television coverage
The Finals were telecast by CBS in the United States, with its coverage anchored by Brent Musburger. Dick Stockton did play-by-play with Tom Heinsohn as color analyst, working their second Finals together. Pat O'Brien worked sideline duties for both teams.

Celebration
The Lakers were invited to a reception at the White House with President Ronald Reagan, where Kareem Abdul-Jabbar presented the President with a jersey. The following Tuesday would be declared "Laker Day" by Los Angeles Mayor Tom Bradley with a parade beginning at 9th in Broadway.

Team rosters

Los Angeles Lakers

Boston Celtics

See also
 1985 NBA Playoffs

References

External links
 NBA History
 1985 NBA Finals at Basketball Reference
 

National Basketball Association Finals
Finals
NBA Finals
NBA Finals
20th century in Los Angeles County, California
NBA Finals
May 1985 sports events in the United States
June 1985 sports events in the United States
Basketball competitions in Boston
Basketball competitions in Inglewood, California
NBA Finals
NBA Finals